Bürglen can refer to several places in Switzerland:

Bürglen, Obwalden, a settlement in the municipality of Lungern in the canton of Obwalden
Bürglen, Thurgau
Bürglen, Uri, at the entrance of Schächental, start of the Klausen pass road
Bürglen (Albis), a mountain in the canton of Zurich